Seyyedabad-e Kalut (also Romanized as Seyyedābād-e Kalūt; also known as Seyyedābād) is a village in Qasabeh-ye Gharbi Rural District, in the Central District of Sabzevar County, Razavi Khorasan Province, Iran. At the 2006 census, its population was 19, in 5 families.

References 

Populated places in Sabzevar County